Psoroma is a genus of lichenized fungi in the family Pannariaceae. The genus was circumscribed by French botanist André Michaux in 1803. The widespread genus contains an estimated 58 species, most of which are found in south temperate regions. Some species formerly in Psoroma were transferred to the new genera Psorophorus and Xanthopsoroma in 2010. The genus Joergensenia was erected in 2008 to contain the species formerly known as Psoroma cephalodinum.

Species
Psoroma absconditum
Psoroma asperellum
Psoroma caliginosum
Psoroma capense – South Africa
Psoroma cinnamomeum
Psoroma cyanosorediatum
Psoroma echinaceum
Psoroma esterhuyseniae – South Africa
Psoroma fruticulosum
Psoroma geminatum
Psoroma hypnorum
Psoroma multifidum
Psoroma papuana
Psoroma pholidotoides
Psoroma saccharatum

References

Lichen genera
Peltigerales
Taxa named by André Michaux
Peltigerales genera